The Brain Prize, formerly known as The Grete Lundbeck European Brain Research Prize, is an international scientific award honouring "one or more scientists who have distinguished themselves by an outstanding contribution to neuroscience and who are still active in research". Founded in 2011 by the Lundbeck Foundation, the prize is associated with a DKK 10 million award to the nominees, the world’s largest brain research prize.

Nominees can be of any nationality. Prize winners are expected to interact with Danish brain researchers e.g. through lectures, master classes, seminars, exchange programmes for researchers or other activities agreed with and financially supported by the Lundbeck Foundation.

History
The Brain Prize was established by the Lundbeck Foundation in 2010 as a European prize and was awarded for the first time in 2011. Today the Prize is global.

Selection committee
As of 2019, the selection committee for the prize consisted of:
Richard G. Morris (chair)
Story Landis (vice chair)
Joseph T. Coyle
Geoffrey Donnan
Catherine Dulac
Ole Petter Ottersen
Mu-ming Poo
Philip Scheltens
Irene Tracey

Laureates
Source: Lundbeck Foundation

See also
The Kavli Prize
Golden Brain Award
Gruber Prize in Neuroscience
W. Alden Spencer Award
Karl Spencer Lashley Award
The Mind & Brain Prize
Ralph W. Gerard Prize in Neuroscience
 List of neuroscience awards
 List of psychology awards

References

Awards established in 2011
Cognitive science awards
Danish science and technology awards
Neuroscience awards